The Rural Municipality of Lakeview is a former rural municipality (RM) in the Canadian province of Manitoba. It was originally incorporated as a rural municipality on April 10, 1920. It ceased on January 1, 2015 as a result of its provincially mandated amalgamation with the RM of Westbourne and the Town of Gladstone to form the Municipality of WestLake – Gladstone.

Located on the west shore of Lake Manitoba, the first immigrants to the area that became the RM were from Iceland. In 1901, the Census listed 142 or the 297 residents (47.8%) as having Icelandic as their mother tongue. The RM's first Council included: Magnus Peterson, G.W. Langdon (reeve), Jas. M. Birnie, John Arksey, Alf W. Law, George Hall and Earl E. Davidson.

Communities 
 Lakeland
 Langruth

Demographics 
According to the 1901 Census records: Population: 297

World War I Enlisted: 58.  World War II Enlisted: 140.

Based on data from "Langruth Along the Crocus Trail", published in 1984:

 Approx area = 240 sq miles covering 3 townships - 15, 16, 17 and ranges 8, 9, 10, and 11.
 Population: 560
 Physical: flat land and bush. Lake Manitoba to the east and Big Grass Marsh to the west. Town of Langruth is on ridge (former shore of Lake Agassiz) that is 70–80 feet above Lake Manitoba.
 Economy: mainly mixed farming and a few independent businesses in town. Per capita income averages range from $5,000 to $30,000. Employment outlook was not good.
 Organizations: United Church, Legion, Ladies Auxiliary, Elks, O.O.R.P., Women's Institute, Skating Rink Committee, Curling Rink Committee, and Hall Committee.
 School: Elementary School with 98 pupils. Part of Pine Creek School Division. High School is in Gladstone.

According to the Canada 2001 Census:

Population: 384
% Change (1996–2001): -5.7
Dwellings: 259
Area (km².): 567.87
Density (persons per km².): 0.7

References

External links 
 Manitoba Historical Society - Manitoba Municipalities: Rural Municipality of Lakeview
Map of Lakeview R.M. at Statcan

Lakeview
Lakeview
Populated places disestablished in 2015
2015 disestablishments in Manitoba